This is a list of 20th-century Mexican composers:

Sergio Berlioz (born 1963)
Miguel Bernal Jiménez (1910–1956)
Julián Carrillo (1875–1965)
Daniel Catán (1949–2011)
Carlos Chavez (1899–1978)
Manuel Enríquez (1926–1994)
Julio Estrada (born 1943)
Blas Galindo (1910–1993)
Luis Herrera de la Fuente (1916–2014)
Rodolfo Halffter (1900–1987)
Juan Sebastian Lach (born 1970)
Ana Lara (born 1959)
Mario Lavista (born 1943)
Sergio Luque (born 1976)
Arturo Marquez (born 1950)
Carlos Jiménez Mabarak (1916–1994)
Eduardo Mata (1942–1995)
José Pablo Moncayo (1912–1958)
Conlon Nancarrow (born 1912)
Carlos Sandoval (born 1956)
Gabriela Ortiz (born 1965)
Hilda Paredes (born 1957)
Gabriel Pareyon (born 1974)
Manuel M. Ponce (1882–1948)
Victor Rasgado (born 1958)
Silvestre Revueltas (1899–1940)
Manuel Rocha Iturbide (born 1963)
Carlos Sanchez-Gutierrez (born 1963)
Carlos Sandoval (born 1956)
Javier Torres Maldonado (born 1968)

External links
 Instituto de Investigaciones Estéticas/UNAM
 La música electroacústica en México
 Home – The Living Composers Project

20th century Mexican composers
Mexican composers
Composers
20th century Mexican composers
20th century in Mexico